A riot is a form of civil disorder commonly characterized by a group lashing out in a violent public disturbance against authority, property, or people.

Riots typically involve destruction of property, public or private. The property targeted varies depending on the riot and the inclinations of those involved. Targets can include shops, cars, restaurants, state-owned institutions, and religious buildings.

Riots often occur in reaction to a grievance or out of dissent. Historically, riots have occurred due to poverty, unemployment, poor living conditions, governmental oppression, taxation or conscription, conflicts between ethnic groups (race riot) or religions (sectarian violence, pogrom), the outcome of a sporting event (sports riot, football hooliganism) or frustration with legal channels through which to air grievances.

While individuals may attempt to lead or control a riot, riots typically consist of disorganized groups that are frequently "chaotic and exhibit herd behavior." There is a growing body of evidence to suggest that riots are not irrational, herd-like behavior (sometimes called mob mentality), but actually follow inverted social norms.

Dealing with riots is often a difficult task for police forces. They may use tear gas or CS gas to control rioters. Riot police may use less-than-lethal methods of control, such as shotguns that fire flexible baton rounds to injure or otherwise incapacitate rioters for easier arrest.

Classification

Food riots are caused by harvest failures, incompetent food storage, hoarding, poisoning of food, or attacks by pests like locusts. When the public becomes desperate from such conditions, groups may attack shops, farms, homes, or government buildings to obtain bread or other staple foods like grain or salt. T. S. Ashton, in his study of food riots among colliers, noted that "the turbulence of the colliers is, of course, to be accounted for by something more elementary than politics: it was the instinctive reaction of virility to hunger." Charles Wilson noted, "Spasmodic rises in food prices provoked keelmen on the Tyne to riot in 1709, tin miners to plunder granaries at Falmouth in 1727." In the 1977 Egyptian Bread Riots, hundreds of thousands of people rioted after food subsidies stopped and prices rose.

A police riot is a term for the disproportionate and unlawful use of force by a group of police against a group of civilians. This term is commonly used to describe a police attack on civilians or provoking civilians into violence.

A political riot is a riot for political purposes or that develops out of a political protest.

A prison riot is a large-scale, temporary act of concerted defiance or disorder by a group of prisoners against prison administrators, prison officers, or other groups of prisoners. It is often done to express a grievance, force change or attempt escape.

In a race riot, race or ethnicity is the key factor. The term had entered the English language in the United States by the 1890s. Early use of the term referred to riots that were often a mob action by members of a majority racial group against people of other perceived races.

In a religious riot, the key factor is religion. The rioting mob targets people and properties of a specific religion, or those believed to belong to that religion.

Sports riots such as the Nika riots can be sparked by the losing or winning of a specific team or athlete. Fans of the two teams may also fight. Sports riots may happen as a result of teams contending for a championship, a long series of matches, or scores that are close. Sports are the most common cause of riots in the United States, accompanying more than half of all championship games or series. Almost all sports riots in the United States occur in the winning team's city.

Effects

The economic and political effects of riots can be as complex as their origins. Property destruction and harm to individuals are often immediately measurable. During the 1992 Los Angeles riots, 2,383 people were injured, more than 12,000 were arrested, 63 people were killed and over 700 businesses burned. Property damage was estimated at over $1 billion. At least ten of those killed were shot by police or National Guard forces.

Similarly, the 2005 civil unrest in France lasted over three weeks and spread to nearly 300 towns. By the end of the incident, over 10,000 vehicles were destroyed and over 300 buildings burned. Over 2,800 suspected rioters were arrested and 126 police and firefighters were injured. Estimated damages were over €200 Million.

Riot control and laws

Riots are typically dealt with by the police, although methods differ from country to country. Tactics and weapons used can include attack dogs, water cannons, plastic bullets, rubber bullets, pepper spray, flexible baton rounds, and snatch squads. Many police forces have dedicated divisions to deal with public order situations. Some examples are the Territorial Support Group (London), Special Patrol Group (London), Compagnies Républicaines de Sécurité (France), Mobiele Eenheid (Netherlands), and Arrest units (Germany).

The policing of riots has been marred by incidents in which police have been accused of provoking rioting or crowd violence. While the weapons described above are officially designated as non-lethal, a number of people have died or been injured as a result of their use. For example, seventeen deaths were caused by rubber bullets in Northern Ireland over the thirty five years between 1970 and 2005.

Risk of arrest
A high risk of being arrested is even more effective against rioting than severe punishments. As more and more people join the riot, the risk of being arrested goes down, which persuades still more people to join.

National laws

India
In India, rioting is an offense under the Indian Penal Code (IPC).

England and Wales

Riot is a statutory offence in England and Wales. It is created by section 1(1) of the Public Order Act 1986. Sections 1(1) to (5) of that Act read:

A single person can be liable for an offence of riot when they use violence, provided that it is shown there were at least twelve present using or threatening unlawful violence.

The word "violence" is defined by section 8. The violence can be against the person or against property. The mens rea is defined by section 6(1).

Indictment

See R v Tyler and others, 96 Cr App R 332, [1993] Crim LR 60, CA.

Mode of trial and sentence

Riot is an indictable-only offence. A person convicted of riot is liable to imprisonment for any term not exceeding ten years, or to a fine, or to both.

See the following cases:
 R v Luttman [1973] Crim LR 127, CA
 R v Pilgrim, 5 Cr App R (S) 140, CA
 R v Keys, 84 Cr App R 204, 8 Cr App R (S) 444, [1987] Crim LR 207, CA
 R v Cooke, 9 Cr App R (S) 116, CA

Association football matches

In the case of riot connected to football hooliganism, the offender may be banned from football grounds for a set or indeterminate period of time and may be required to surrender their passport to the police for a period of time in the event of a club or international match, or international tournament, connected with the offence. This prevents travelling to the match or tournament in question. (The measures were brought in by the Football (Disorder) Act 2000 after rioting of England fans at Euro 2000.)

Compensation for riot damage

See the Riot (Damages) Act 1886 and section 235 of the Merchant Shipping Act 1995.

Construction of "riot" and cognate expressions in other instruments

Section 10 of the Public Order Act 1986 now provides:

As to this provision, see pages 84 and 85 of the Law Commission's report.

Common law offence

The common law offence of riot was abolished for England and Wales on 1 April 1987.

History

In the past, the Riot Act had to be read by an official – with the wording exactly correct – before violent policing action could take place. If the group did not disperse after the Act was read, lethal force could legally be used against the crowd. See also the Black Act.

Section 515 of the Merchant Shipping Act 1894 formerly made provision for compensation for riot damage.

Northern Ireland
Riot is a serious offence for the purposes of Chapter 3 of the Criminal Justice (Northern Ireland) Order 2008.

See paragraph 13 of Schedule 5 to the Electoral Law Act (Northern Ireland) 1962.

Scotland
There is an offence under the law of Scotland which is known both as "mobbing" and "mobbing and rioting".

In July 1981, both Dundee and Edinburgh saw significant disorder as part of the events of that July, while in 1994 and in 2013, two years after the English riots of August 2011, Edinburgh saw rioting, albeit localised to one specific area and not part of any bigger 'riot wave'. Events in 1981 were very similar to those in England, although sources are severely limited. Both Niddrie and Craigmillar saw riots in the 1980s.

Israel
In 1988 the Israeli army issued rules of engagement for the use of plastic bullets which defined a "violent riot" as : a disturbance with the participation of three or more persons, including stone throwing, erection of a barrier or barricade, burning a tire.

United States

Under United States federal law, a riot is defined as:
 A public disturbance involving (1) an act or acts of violence by one or more persons part of an assemblage of three or more persons, which act or acts shall constitute a clear and present danger of, or shall result in, damage or injury to the property of any other person or to the person of any other individual or (2) a threat or threats of the commission of an act or acts of violence by one or more persons part of an assemblage of three or more persons having, individually or collectively, the ability of immediate execution of such threat or threats, where the performance of the threatened act or acts of violence would constitute a clear and present danger of, or would result in, damage or injury to the property of any other person or to the person of any other individual..

Each state may have its own definition of a riot. In New York, the term riot is not defined explicitly, but under § 240.08 of the New York Penal Law, "A person is guilty of inciting to riot when one urges ten or more persons to engage in tumultuous and violent conduct of a kind likely to create public alarm."

See also

 1967 Newark riots
 1977 Egyptian bread riots
 2007–2008 world food price crisis
 2020 Black Lives Matter unrest
 1992 Los Angeles riots
 Black bloc
 First Quarter Storm
 Flour riot of 1837
 Boston Bread riot
 Civil disorder
 Class conflict
 Collective effervescence
 Coup d'état
 Demonstration
 Ferguson unrest
 George Floyd protests
 Gwangju Uprising
 Internal security
 Insurrectionary anarchism
 January 6 United States Capitol attack
 List of incidents of civil unrest in the United States
 King assassination riots
 List of food riots
 List of riots
 Lynching
 Plaza Miranda bombing
 Pogrom
 Poll tax riots
 Protest
 People power
 Rebellion
 Revolution
 Riot Acts
 Riot dog
 Riot gun
 Secession
 Sit-in
 Southern bread riots
 Stonewall riot
 Student riot
 Urban riot
 Wrocław football riot 2003

References

Sources:
 Blackstone's Police Manuals. Volume 5, "General police duties". Fraser Simpson (2006). p. 245. Oxford University Press. .

Further reading
 
 
 Bohstedt J. 1983. Riots and Community Politics in England and Wales, 1790–1810. Cambridge, MA: Harvard Univ. Press
 
 
  Online pp. 594
 Olzak S, Shanahan S, McEneaney EH. 1996. "Poverty, segregation and race riots: 1960 to 1993." Am. Sociol. Rev. 61(4):590–613
 
 Wilkinson, Steven. 2009. "Riots." Annual Review of Political Science.
 Wilkinson S. 2004. Votes and Violence: Ethnic Competition and Ethnic Riots in India. New York: Cambridge Univ. Press

External links

 
Protests
Civil disobedience